Ancylolomia melanothoracia is a moth in the family Crambidae. It was described by George Hampson in 1919. It is found in Tanzania.

References

Endemic fauna of Tanzania
Ancylolomia
Moths described in 1919
Moths of Africa